Gustaf Lennart Lind (24 June 1893 – 6 August 1961) was a Finnish wrestler. He competed in the light heavyweight event at the 1912 Summer Olympics, but was eliminated in the second bout.

References

External links
 

1893 births
1961 deaths
Olympic wrestlers of Finland
Wrestlers at the 1912 Summer Olympics
Finnish male sport wrestlers
People from Porvoo
Sportspeople from Uusimaa